Matthew Marsh may refer to:
Matthew Marsh (racing driver) (born 1968), British racing driver
Matthew Marsh (actor) (born 1954), English actor
Matthew Marsh (boxer) (born 1982), British professional boxer 
Matthew Henry Marsh, British Member of Parliament for Salisbury and Queensland pioneer pastoralist
Matty Marsh, English rugby league footballer